Natural History: The Very Best of Talk Talk is a 1990 greatest hits album by Talk Talk. It collects songs that the band released under EMI between 1982 and 1988.

Reception
The compilation spent 21 weeks on the UK Albums Chart, peaking at #3, and went on to sell over one million copies worldwide. The North American version appended two live bonus tracks. A companion collection of the band's music videos was released in July 1990.

Production and re-releases
EMI released the compilation without the band's supervision. Talk Talk leader Mark Hollis said, "A compilation album is not my idea of an album. I don't like compilation albums and I didn't like that one. It certainly wasn't the selection of tracks I would have liked even if there had to be one. But, at the end of the day, they had every right to do it so . . ." In light of Natural History's success, the remix album History Revisited was released in 1991. Talk Talk sued EMI for remixing their material without permission. Though the collection contains no new material, it does have the non-LP 1983 single, "My Foolish Friend", which had never appeared on a full-length release before. On 12 March 2007 the album was reissued with a bonus DVD of their music videos. Two bonus tracks were also included from the 1999 live release London 1986.

Track listing 

 "Today" (Brenner, Harris, Hollis, Webb) – 3:30
 "Talk Talk" (Hollis, Hollis) – 3:18
 "My Foolish Friend" (Brenner, Hollis) – 3:21
 "Such a Shame" (Hollis) – 5:43
 "Dum Dum Girl" (Friese-Greene, Hollis) – 3:49
 "It's My Life" (Friese-Greene, Hollis) – 3:55
 "Give It Up" (Friese-Greene, Hollis) – 5:19
 "Living in Another World" (Friese-Greene, Hollis) – 6:57
 "Life's What You Make It" (Friese-Greene, Hollis) – 4:29
 "Happiness Is Easy" (Friese-Greene, Hollis) – 6:33
 "I Believe in You" (Friese-Greene, Hollis) – 6:04
 "Desire" (Friese-Greene, Hollis) – 7:00

 Bonus tracks on the CD release
 "Life's What You Make It (Live @ the Hammersmith Odeon)" (Friese-Greene, Hollis) — 4:40
 "Tomorrow's Started (Live @ the Hammersmith Odeon)" (Hollis) — 7:45

 Reissued 2007 reissue listing
 "Today" (Brenner, Harris, Hollis, Webb) – 3:30
 "Have You Heard the News" (Hollis) – 5:04
 "Talk Talk" (Hollis, Hollis) – 3:15
 "My Foolish Friend" (Brenner, Hollis) – 3:18
 "Such a Shame" (Hollis) – 5:22
 "Dum Dum Girl" (Friese-Greene, Hollis) – 4:02
 "It's My Life" (Friese-Greene, Hollis) – 3:51
 "Give It Up" (Friese-Greene, Hollis) – 5:19
 "Living in Another World" (Friese-Greene, Hollis) – 7:00
 "Life's What You Make It" (Friese-Greene, Hollis) – 4:25
 "Happiness Is Easy" (Friese-Greene, Hollis) – 6:29
 "I Believe in You" (Friese-Greene, Hollis) – 5:55
 "Desire" (Friese-Greene, Hollis) – 6:56
 "Life's What You Make It" [live from the Hammersmith Odeon] (Friese-Greene, Hollis) – 4:40
 "Tomorrow Started" [live from the Hammersmith Odeon] (Hollis) – 7:45

Certifications

Credits 
 James Marsh – cover art

References 

Talk Talk albums
1990 greatest hits albums